The Ohio Electric Railway was an interurban railroad formed in 1907 with the consolidation of 14 smaller interurban railways. It was Ohio's largest interurban, connecting Toledo, Lima, Dayton, Columbus, and Cincinnati. At its peak it operated  of track. Never financially healthy, the company went bankrupt in 1921 and was dissolved into its constituent companies.

History
The Ohio Electric Railway was formed on May 16, 1907. The organizers of the new company were Randal Morgan, W. Kesley Schoepf, and Hugh J. McGowan. Beginning in September 1907 and continuing into 1908 the new company acquired or leased the fourteen other companies which would comprise its system:

 Cincinnati, Dayton and Toledo Traction
 Columbus and Lake Michigan Railroad
 Columbus, Buckeye Lake and Newark Traction
 Columbus, Grove City and South Western Railway
 Columbus, London and Springfield Railway
 Dayton and Muncie Traction
 Dayton and Western Traction
 Dayton, Springfield and Urbana Electric Railway
 Fort Wayne, Van Wert and Lima Traction
 Indiana Columbus and Eastern Traction
 Lima and Toledo Traction
 Lima Electric Railway and Light
 Springfield and Western Railway
 Urbana, Bellefontaine and Northern Railway

The Ohio Electric proved to be financially unsound. It paid no dividends during its corporate existence and lost $1.5 million as a result of the Great Dayton Flood in 1913. In 1918 it spun off its Cincinnati–Dayton line to the Cincinnati and Dayton Traction company. This trend continued in 1920 when spun off the Dayton and Western Traction in its entirety. The end came in 1921: the company went bankrupt and dissolved. Most of the constituent companies went bankrupt as well, but continued operating. Several companies would later come together to form the Cincinnati and Lake Erie Railroad in 1930.

Notes

References
 
 Cincinnati and Lake Erie

Further reading

See also
 Cincinnati and Lake Erie Railroad

Defunct Ohio railroads
Interurban railways in Ohio
1907 establishments in Ohio
Railway companies established in 1907
Railway companies disestablished in 1921
American companies disestablished in 1921